Évry is the name or part of the name of the following communes in France:
 Évry, Essonne, former commune in the Essonne department
 Évry, Yonne, in the Yonne department
 Évry-Courcouronnes, in the Essonne department
 Évry-Grégy-sur-Yerre, in the Seine-et-Marne department